In mathematics, the Kampé de Fériet function is a two-variable generalization of the generalized hypergeometric series, introduced by Joseph Kampé de Fériet.

The Kampé de Fériet function is given by

Applications
The general sextic equation can be solved in terms of Kampé de Fériet functions.

References

External links

Hypergeometric functions